Tannbach is a brook that is  long in north-east Bavaria and southern Thuringia, Germany.

The source is located east of Gefell in the Saale-Orla-Kreis district in Thuringia. Initially it flows south through Gebersreuth, a district of Gefell, before reaching Mödlareuth. During the Cold War the little brook marked the border between West and East Germany and divided the little village into two parts. After Mödlareuth it flows in south-westerly direction before it joins the Saale as right tributary.

See also
List of rivers of Bavaria
List of rivers of Thuringia

References

Rivers of Bavaria
Rivers of Thuringia
Rivers of Germany